Harry Brown is a 2009 British vigilante action-thriller film directed by Daniel Barber and starring Michael Caine, Emily Mortimer, Jack O'Connell, and Liam Cunningham. The story follows Harry Brown, a widowed Royal Marines veteran who had served in Northern Ireland during The Troubles, living on a London housing estate that is rapidly descending into youth crime. After a violent gang murders his friend, Harry decides to take justice into his own hands.

The film also features actor and rapper Plan B, who recorded the film's theme music track "End Credits" with Chase & Status. Harry Brown premiered on 12 September 2009 as a "Special Presentation" at the 2009 Toronto International Film Festival and was released theatrically in the United Kingdom by Lionsgate UK on 11 November 2009; the film was released in the United States by Samuel Goldwyn Films and Destination Films on 30 April 2010. The film received mixed reviews from critics, who praised Caine's performance but criticized the excessive violence.

Plot
Elderly pensioner Harry Brown, a decorated Royal Marine  veteran of the Northern Ireland conflict, lives on a London council estate infested with violent youth gang activity and illegal narcotics distribution. Harry spends most of his free time playing chess with his friend, Len Attwell, at a local pub owned by Sid Rourke. When the hospital phones about his wife Kath's imminent demise, Harry arrives too late as the pedestrian underpass shortcut is active gang territory. Kath is buried next to their thirteen-year-old daughter, Rachel, who died of pneumonia in 1973.

Len confides to Harry that he is being terrorised by youths and shows him an old bayonet he now carries to defend himself; with the police unable to help, he plans to confront his harassers himself. The next day, Detective Inspector Alice Frampton and Detective Sergeant Terry Hicock visit Harry and inform him that Len is dead. The police arrest Noel Winters, the leader of a drug-dealing gang, along with members Carl, Dean and Marky, but they are released due to insufficient evidence. After Len's funeral, an inebriated Harry is frozen when confronted by Dean at knife-point, for his wallet; almost instinctually, presumably due to his military training, Harry kills Dean with his own knife during a brief struggle. 
DI Frampton visits Harry the next morning, as Len was killed with his own bayonet, any charges could be reduced to manslaughter or even self-defence, incensing Harry.

That night Harry follows a drug dealer, Kenny, from a pub, to a  tenement, where they negotiate the purchase of a 9mm pistol. Inside, Harry finds Kenny and his mate, Stretch, growing cannabis and manipulating a young female heroin addict, to make pornographic films. Harry, mortified by their treatment of the comatose young woman, shoots the two dealers and sets their den ablaze,  fleeing with the girl, a bag of firearms and a large sum of cash in their military transport truck. He leaves the girl outside a hospital, and then tracks Marky to a secluded, wooded area, shooting the older drug boss who is sexually abusing him. Harry ties up Marky, coercing him into revealing mobile phone footage of Len's cold blooded murder. Harry then uses Marky to bait Noel and Carl in the underpass; a gunfight ensues, Carl and Marky are killed, but Noel flees. Harry pursues, but collapses from an emphysema attack. Harry is found and taken to hospital, where DI Frampton smells cordite gun residue on his overcoat. 

Frampton has deduced that Harry is behind all the recent shootings, but her boss—Superintendent Childs—is dismissive, convinced of an escalating gang war, and congratulates her on a new position he has "arranged" for her.
Childs leads a major police operation on the estate, which escalates into a riot. Meanwhile, Harry discharges himself from the hospital. Driving to the estate, Frampton and Hicock are involved in a car crash in which Hicock is severely injured. Harry appears and takes them into Sid's pub, where Frampton calls for backup and informs Harry that Sid is Noel's uncle, so shooting Noel is dubious at best. 

Harry discovers Sid hiding Noel in the basement, but has an emphysema fit, allowing Sid to disarm him and reveal himself as the gang's true leader. Sid suffocates the injured Hicock, and Noel begins to strangle Frampton. A weakened Harry draws a concealed ankle pistol and kills Noel; Sid then shoots Harry and prepares to finish him, as two red police sniper dots mark Sid's chest. Unaware of this, Sid is baited by Harry to raise his gun and is immediately shot dead by the outside marksmen.

At a press conference after the riot, Superintendent Childs announces that Frampton and Hicock are to be awarded medals, but denies evidence of a vigilante. Harry walks towards the now quiet and gang-free underpass.

Cast

 Michael Caine as Harold "Harry" Brown
 Emily Mortimer as Detective Inspector Alice Frampton
 Charlie Creed Miles as Detective Sergeant Terence "Terry" Hicock
 David Bradley as Leonard "Len" Attwell
 Ben Drew as Noel Winters
 Sean Harris as Stretch
 Jack O'Connell as Marky
 Jamie Downey as Carl
 Lee Oakes as Dean Saunders
 Joe Gilgun as Kenneth "Kenny" Soames
 Liam Cunningham as Sidney "Sid" Rourke
 Iain Glen as Superintendent Childs
 Klariza Clayton as Sharon "Shaz" Thompson
 Liz Daniels as Katherine "Kath" Brown
 Orla O'Rourke as Nurse # 2
 Chris Wilson as Daniel Ladlow Assistant Chief Constable
 Ashley McGuire as Community WPC
 Charles Ramsay as Officer Charlie Ramsay

Production 
The film was shot mainly in and around the abandoned Heygate Estate in Walworth, London. At the time of filming, it was due to be demolished, which did not happen until early 2014. The subway scenes were shot at Marks Gate, London.

Reception
On Rotten Tomatoes 63% of critics have given the film a positive review based on 127 reviews, with an average score of 6/10. The website's critical consensus states, "Its lurid violence may put off some viewers, but Harry Brown is a vigilante thriller that carries an emotional as well as a physical punch, thanks to a gripping performance from Michael Caine in the title role." On Metacritic it has a score of 55% based on reviews from 35 critics. Empire gave the film four stars out of five. GQ magazine gave it five stars out of five, calling it "truly awesome."

The Times gave the film three stars but considered it "morally and politically odious." The Sunday Times was less positive, giving it one star: "It's too daft to pass muster as action-movie hokum, let alone as social commentary." Cinema Blend praised the film, saying "Caine pours every ounce of himself into Harry, and the payoff is massive ... There's nothing more fulfilling than seeing a compelling story brought to life by standout performances and then further enhanced by stellar directing." Roger Ebert of the Chicago Sun-Times gave the film three stars out of four, and called the film "... a revenge thriller poised somewhere between Death Wish and Gran Torino." 

As of 20 December 2009 the film had earned $6,649,562 in the UK market opening against 2012 and Disney's A Christmas Carol. As of 8 August 2010, total worldwide gross was nearly $10 million including $1,818,681 in the United States, where it opened against A Nightmare on Elm Street.

References

External links
 
 
 

2009 films
2009 crime thriller films
2000s gang films
British crime thriller films
Films shot at Elstree Film Studios
Films about grieving
Films about murderers
Films about old age
Hood films
British films about revenge
Films about widowhood
Films directed by Daniel Barber
Films set in London
Films set in the 21st century
Films shot in London
Lionsgate films
HanWay Films films
British neo-noir films
British vigilante films
Films produced by Matthew Vaughn
2009 directorial debut films
2000s English-language films
2000s American films
2000s British films
2000s vigilante films